The white cerebellum sign, also known as reversal sign or dense cerebellum sign, is a radiological sign denoting the relatively white appearance of the cerebellum due to a generalized decrease in density of the supratentorial brain structures caused by extensive edema.

Causes
White cerebellum sign can be associated with raised intracranial pressure that occurs due to anoxic or ischemic changes in the brain. It can be found in:
 Birth asphyxia
 Status epilepticus
 Bacterial meningitis
 Encephalitis
 Severe head trauma
 Post-cardiac arrest hypoxia
 Drowning

Pathophysiology
Diffuse brain edema is the likely cause of this radiological change observed in CT or MRI.

Prognosis
It was considered to indicate a bad prognosis. However, evidence suggests that it could be a non-specific indicator of diffuse brain edema which might not be as ominous as previously thought.

References

External resources

Radiologic signs